Arumbavur is a Town Panchayat at Veppanthattai Taluk in Perambalur district  in the state of Tamil Nadu, India. The Arumbavur Town Panchayat is divided into 15 Wards (Ward No. 1 to Ward No. 15) for which the elections are held every 5 years. According to 2011 Census, there are total 3,452 families residing in the Arumbavur [TP]. Arumbavur is popularly renowned for Wooden Carvings (Handmade) worldwide. The 500 years old Arumbavur Wooden Carving artisans have their origin traced from Madurai. The Artisans' unique specialities is to hand carve the Wooden Statues, Natural figures, House Main Doors, Pooja Doors, Pooja Mandapas, Wall Panels, Pillars, Wall Brackets, Temple Doors, Temple Cars(Thaer), Ratham, Vaaganam, Church Wall Panels etc., which are manufactured and exported to various parts of the World. The Arumbavur wooden carvings has been granted Geographical Indication tag for its distinctiveness and quality.

Geography
It has an average elevation of .It is surrounded by pachamalai hills in the South and West. Arumbavur is located 26 km towards north from District Headquarters - Perambalur, 13 km from the taluk Veppanthattai and nearly 300 km from the State capital Chennai.

Demographics
According to 2011 census, Arumbavur Town Panchayat covering an area of 22.60 square kilometres had a population of 12,467 with a sex ratio of 1014 females for every 1000 males, much above the national average of 929. Male and Female population counted to 6,191 and 6,276 respectively. A total of 1,211 were under the age of 6 (which is 9.71% of total population of Arumbavur [TP]), of which Males constitute 648 and females 563. Arumbavur has an average Literacy rate of 75.92%, a bit higher than the national average of 74.0%; with 83.85% of the males and 68.23% of females literate.

Education 
The schools currently running at this location are
 Primary Schools at Arumbavur and A.Mettur
 Government Higher Secondary School
 Shanthiniketan Matriculation Higher Secondary School
 Swami Vivekananda Matriculation Higher Secondary School
 Sri Raghavendra Higher Secondary School
 Swami Vivekananda Polytechnic College
 Galaxy nursery and primary school

Hospitals
 Government Primary Health Care - Arumbavur
 Dr. K. Gopal Nursing Home
 G.V. Hospitals
 The Best Hospital (Dr. A. Ananda Moorthy)

Police Station
 Arumbavur Police Station (The only station for surrounding villages like Poolambadi, Periammapalayam, Malayalapatti, Kottarakundru, Thaluthalai, Thalai Nagar, Vengalam, Krishnapuram, Venganur, Thondamanthurai etc.,)

References
{{}}

Cities and towns in Perambalur district